Dlouhá Lhota (The Long Lhota) is the name of several locations in the Czech Republic:

 Dlouhá Lhota (Blansko District), a village in  the South Moravian Region
 Dlouhá Lhota (Mladá Boleslav District), a village in the Central Bohemian Region
 Dlouhá Lhota (Příbram District), a village in the Central Bohemian Region
 Dlouhá Lhota (Tábor District), a village in the South Bohemian Region